Henry Sheppard (born November 12, 1952) is a former American football offensive lineman in the National Football League. He was drafted by the Cleveland Browns in the fifth round of the 1976 NFL Draft. He played college football at SMU.

1952 births
Living people
American football offensive tackles
American football offensive guards
SMU Mustangs football players
Cleveland Browns players
People from Cuero, Texas